The Battle of Santiago was a football match during the 1962 FIFA World Cup, played between host Chile and Italy on 2 June 1962 in Santiago. It gained its nickname from the level of violence seen in the game, in which two players were sent off, numerous punches were thrown and police intervention was required four times. The referee was Ken Aston, who later went on to invent yellow and red cards.

Background
In this Group B clash, already heightened tensions between the two football teams were exacerbated by the description of Santiago in crude terms by two Italian journalists,  and Corrado Pizzinelli; they had written that Santiago was a backwater dump where "the phones don't work, taxis are as rare as faithful husbands, a cable to Europe costs an arm and a leg and a letter takes five days to turn up", and its population as prone to "malnutrition, illiteracy, alcoholism and poverty. Chile is a small, proud and poor country: it has agreed to organise this World Cup in the same way as Mussolini agreed to send our air force to bomb London (they didn't arrive). The capital city has 700 hotel beds. Entire neighbourhoods are given over to open prostitution. This country and its people are proudly miserable and backwards." Chilean newspapers fired back, describing Italians in general as fascists, mafiosos, oversexed, and, because some of Inter Milan's players had recently been involved in a doping scandal, drug addicts. The journalists involved were forced to flee the country, while an Argentinian scribe mistaken for an Italian in a Santiago bar was beaten up and hospitalised.

Chile's organisation of and preparation for the tournament had been severely disrupted by the 1960 Valdivia earthquake, the strongest earthquake ever recorded in human history. Articles in the Italian papers La Nazione and Corriere della Sera were saying that allowing Chile to host the World Cup was "pure madness"; this was used and magnified by local newspapers to inflame the Chilean population. The British newspaper the Daily Express wrote "The tournament shows every sign of developing into a violent bloodbath. Reports read like battlefront despatches. Italy vs Germany was described as 'wrestling and warfare.'"

Match

Summary

The first foul occurred within 12 seconds of kick-off. Italy's Giorgio Ferrini was sent off in the eighth minute after a foul on Honorino Landa, but refused to leave the pitch and had to be dragged off by policemen. English referee Ken Aston did nothing after a left-hook punch by Chilean outside-left Leonel Sánchez to Italian right-back Mario David, which had come in retaliation for being fouled seconds earlier. When David attempted to kick Sánchez in the head a few minutes later, he was sent off. In the violence that continued, Sánchez broke Humberto Maschio's nose with a left hook, but Aston again did not send him off. The two teams engaged in scuffles and spitting, and police had to intervene three more times.

Chile won the match 2–0, with a headed goal from Jaime Ramírez and a low long-range shot from Jorge Toro, both in the last 16 minutes.

Aston, who had now refereed both of Chile's matches, never oversaw a World Cup match again, becoming a senior member of the refereeing committees of the 1966 and 1970 championships.

In his work The Complete Book of the World Cup (Harper Sport), Cris Freddi described the match as "…a horror show, the last of the three great World Cup slugfests."  On the same day, Yugoslavia beat Uruguay 3–1 with both teams having a player sent off – Vladimir Popović and Ángel Rubén Cabrera – and Freddi wrote of their opening match against Switzerland: "Chile responded [to conceding an early goal] with some grim tackling, a feature of this World Cup.  Aston booked Eschmann then Rojas but should have sent both off when they came to blows a few minutes later."

Aftermath
When highlights from the match were shown on British television a couple of days later (not the same night, because film of matches had to be flown back to the UK), the match was introduced by BBC sports commentator David Coleman as "the most stupid, appalling, disgusting and disgraceful exhibition of football, possibly in the history of the game." Stones were thrown at some Italian players at their training camp.

Coleman also observed that it was the first meeting between the sides and "we hope it will be the last." However, the sides were drawn together at the 1966 World Cup and met at Sunderland's Roker Park ground with Italy winning 2–0. The rematch also featured unsportsmanlike play but to a lesser degree.

Details

See also
Battle of Highbury
Battle of Berne
Battle of Bordeaux
Battle of Bramall Lane
Battle of Nuremberg
Football War

References

External links
Video of the match in full length

 

1962 FIFA World Cup
1962
1962
FIFA World Cup matches
Brawls in team sports
Chile–Italy relations
Italy at the 1962 FIFA World Cup
Chile at the 1962 FIFA World Cup
FIFA World Cup controversies
June 1962 sports events in South America
Nicknamed sporting events